University of Kota (UOK) is a public university in Kota, Rajasthan, India. It offers undergraduate and postgraduate courses

History
UOK was established through the University of Kota Act 2003. B. L. Verma was appointed as the first Vice Chancellor (VC) of the university, while the Governor of Rajasthan is the chancellor of the university. Neelima Singh was appointes VC of the university in 2021.

Afiliated colleges
The University of Kota has 175 affiliated colleges and autonomous departments across the six districts of the Rajasthan state, Kota, Jhalawar, Bundi, Baran, Karauli and Sawai Madhopur, which are under the territorial jurisdiction of the university. The university has six faculties - Arts, Science, Social Sciences, Commerce and Management, Law and Education.

See also 
 Educational Institutions in Delhi
 Universities and colleges in India

References

External links
 Official site

Universities and colleges in Kota, Rajasthan
University of Kota
Educational institutions established in 2003
2003 establishments in Rajasthan